Adam Tambellini (born November 1, 1994) is a Canadian professional ice hockey forward who is currently playing for Rögle BK of the Swedish Hockey League (SHL). Tambellini was selected by the New York Rangers in the third round (65th overall) of the 2013 NHL Entry Draft.

Playing career
Tambellini played top midget hockey in Alberta before playing three games with the Sherwood Park Crusaders in the Alberta Junior Hockey League during the 2010–11 season as a 16-year-old. He then continued his junior career, playing two seasons in the British Columbia Hockey League (BCHL) with the Vernon Vipers and the Surrey Eagles before committing to college hockey with the University of North Dakota in the National Collegiate Hockey Conference.

After his selection by the Rangers at the 2013 NHL Entry Draft, Tambellini played just 16 games in his freshman year with the Fighting Hawks in 2013–14 season. He then opted to leave college to return to Canada to play major junior hockey in the Western Hockey League (WHL) after his rights were acquired by the Calgary Hitmen from the Portland Winterhawks on January 8, 2014. He regained his scoring touch in the WHL playing out the remainder of the season in producing 39 points in just 31 games.

In his first full season with the Hitmen in 2014–15, Tambellini scored 86 points in 71 games to earn a selection to the East Second All-Star Team. On March 10, 2015, it was announced that Tambellini had signed a three-year, entry-level contract with the New York Rangers.

In his first professional season with the Rangers organization, Tambellini was assigned to its AHL affiliate, the Hartford Wolf Pack for the 2015–16 season. In his rookie campaign, Tambellini finished with a promising 17 goals and 32 points in 74 games.

Following his third season with the Wolf Pack, Tambellini was not extended a qualifying offer at the conclusion of his entry-level contract. As a free agent, he signed a one-year, two-way contract with the Ottawa Senators on July 25, 2018. After attending his first training camp with Ottawa, Tambellini was assigned to Belleville to play for the Senators for the 2018–19 season

International play
Tambellini played for Team Canada at the 2022 Winter Olympics, scoring seven points in five games and leading Canada in scoring for the tournament.

Personal
Tambellini is the son of former Edmonton Oilers general manager, Steve Tambellini, and his older brother Jeff also played professionally in the NHL. His grandfather Addie Tambellini also played ice hockey.

Career statistics

Regular season and playoffs

International

Awards and honours

References

External links

1994 births
Living people
Belleville Senators players
Calgary Hitmen players
Canadian ice hockey forwards
Hartford Wolf Pack players
Modo Hockey players
New York Rangers draft picks
North Dakota Fighting Hawks men's ice hockey players
Rögle BK players
Sherwood Park Crusaders players
Ice hockey people from Edmonton
Surrey Eagles players
Vernon Vipers players
Ice hockey players at the 2022 Winter Olympics
Olympic ice hockey players of Canada